Since the 1988 tournament, Japan has qualified for eight consecutive AFC Asian Cups from 1992 to 2019. Japan is also the most successful team in the tournament with 4 titles.

Although having an impressive records, Japan was not a continental football power until 1988, and outside the 1968 Summer Olympics shock, Japan had been regarded as a weak team in the continent. It was just after qualified for the 1988 edition and being awarded as host for the 1992 AFC Asian Cup that saw resurgence and rise of football in Japan. Overall, Japan missed eight first editions before 1988. In response, Japanese football grew rapidly and soon replaced traditional powerhouses like South Korea, Iran and Saudi Arabia as new emerging and eventually, dominant football power in Asia, although recent rise of Australia has posed challenge for Japan's dominant position.

Japan results in the Asian Cup

* hosts

1988 AFC Asian Cup

Japan made debut at 1988 Asian Cup and it was the historical achievement that would put milestone for Japan to envision and develop its football, which was then-limited in amateur football. In the whole tournament however, Japan ended up finishing last, with just one draw and three defeats, scoring zero goal and conceded six goals.

Although it was not a successful tournament, qualifying to the Asian Cup had been the source of Japan's football renaissance in the country, and subsequent tournaments later would have proven this.

1992 AFC Asian Cup

Japan was the host of the 1992 tournament, and placed together with North Korea, Iran and the UAE. Japan was expected to pass through semi-finals only, however Japan had done even better than that.

Japan opened their account with two draws against the UAE and North Korea, before winning the first ever match in the Asian Cup, 1–0, over Iran, effectively eliminated Iran and North Korea. Japan kept firing by a 3–2 thrilling victory over China, before defeating Saudi Arabia 1–0 in the final. With the win, Japan claimed their first Asian title, marked the begin of a new Asian football power that would have a huge consequence for the next years.

Knockout stage
Semi-finals

Final

Ironically, in spite of the victory, Japan failed to qualify for 1994 World Cup, despite being Asian champion, and Hans Ooft, the manager who helped Japan win maiden Asian Cup, was fired later after the failure.

1996 AFC Asian Cup

Having won the previous edition, Japan was expected to become a contender for the Asian title twice. That's said, however, Japan's performance turned to be a great disappointment. Japan won all three matches in the group stage against Syria, China and Uzbekistan and won the group with full nine points. Even though their group stage performances were impressive, the quarter-final match against Kuwait proved to be a disaster when they lost 0–2, eventually ended Japan's hope to defend the title.

Knockout stage
Quarter-finals

Manager Shu Kamo was allowed to keep his job, but 1998 World Cup qualification under his tenure was not successful and he was replaced by Takeshi Okada, his assistant, for the remaining crucial matches. Japan would have qualified to the World Cup for the first time.

2000 AFC Asian Cup

Japan came to Lebanon 2000 with high hope to win the Asian Cup, having participated in their maiden World Cup in France. In there, Japan was placed with defending champions Saudi Arabia, Qatar and Uzbekistan. For Japan, the tournament was seen as perpetration for 2002 World Cup to be held in their home soil.

Japan proved to be so strong when they demolished defending champion Saudi Arabia 4–1 and Uzbekistan 8–1. After two matches, Japan drew Qatar 1–1. Qatar would go on to be the only team that didn't lose to Japan in the tournament. Japan kept on their impressive running by beating Iraq 4–1, China 3–2 before won the final against Saudi Arabia for the second times, 1–0. Japan claimed their second title and had officially established themselves as a new Asian football powerhouse.

Knockout stage
Quarter-finals

Semi-finals

Final

This impressive running in 2000 Asian Cup proved to be useful for Japan two years later, when Japan passed through the group stage for the first time, before losing to later third-place Turkey 0–1 in the round of sixteen.

2004 AFC Asian Cup

Japan, having established themselves as a football powerhouse in the continent, was placed in Group D with Iran, Thailand and debutant Oman. Japan, however, had a hard beginning with just a 1–0 win to Oman, before demolished Thailand 4–1 next. Japan, like 2000 edition, drew the last match with Iran 0–0 and qualified to the quarter-finals when they faced up another debutant, Jordan. Jordan however proved to be a tough team when they held on Japan for 120 minutes with a 1–1 draw, before Japan won on the penalty shootout. In the semi-finals, Japan also needed 120 minutes to defeat another Arab team, Bahrain, in a 4–3 thriller.

In the final, Japan faced host China, and despite being thought to be even much harder than with Jordan and Bahrain since China was the host, Japan surprisingly defeated China 3–1 in just 90 minutes, including a hand goal from Koji Nakata, which was controversial aftermath. Thus, Japan for the second times won the title, continued to be the dominant force in Asia.

Knockout stage
Quarter-finals

Semi-finals

Final

2007 AFC Asian Cup

In the next editions, Japan seemed to be placed in a much easier group than three years ago, when Japan was drawn with host Vietnam, Qatar and the UAE. Qatar and the UAE had also won 2006 Asian Games and 18th Arabian Gulf Cup, effectively putting Japan on board with two other champions outside host Vietnam.

However, Japan opened their accounts unimpressive with just a 1–1 draw to Qatar, which made Ivica Osim to label his players as "amateur". Japan went on to beat the UAE 3–1 and Vietnam 4–1, the latter would join Japan into the quarter-finals. Japan later took vengeance on Australia by defeating the Socceroos 4–3 in the penalty shootout in Hanoi. However, within the same stuff, Japan lost to eventual runners-up Saudi Arabia 2–3 and had to play the third-place match, when they lost on penalty shootout this time, 5–6, to rival South Korea.

Knockout stage
Quarter-finals

Semi-finals

Third-place match

2011 AFC Asian Cup

After just won 4th place four years before, Japan had to take part on the qualification round, where they won first to qualify for the tournament. Once again, Japan was placed with Saudi Arabia, alongside Jordan and Syria, both had not participated four years ago.

However, Japan was stunned by Jordan after just a 1–1 draw, drew criticisms from the fans and coach Alberto Zaccheroni had to change tactics to suit the situation. The match with Syria had also drawn criticisms later due to poor performance of Japanese players, despite winning 2–1. Nonetheless, these criticisms vanished when Japan destroyed Saudi Arabia 5–0 to march into the quarter-finals facing host Qatar.

In the quarter-final match, Japan suffered even a red card and two goals-lead by Qatar, but in the end Japan fought back and won 3–2, eliminated host Qatar from the tournament. Japan would make up meeting with old rival South Korea, where they drew 2–2 after 120 minutes before winning 3–0 on penalty shootout and went into the final.

In the final, Japan met Asia's no.1 ranking team, Australia. Nonetheless, despite heavy pressures from the Socceroos, Japan withstood and at the extra time, Tadanari Lee scored the only goal in the match, helping Japan to claim the title for the fourth times, became the most successful team in the tournament's history.

Knockout stage
Quarter-finals

Semi-finals

Final

Keisuke Honda was awarded as the most valuable player in the tournament.

2015 AFC Asian Cup

Having won four titles, Japan was considered as the contender for the next title in the 2015 Asian Cup, where they were drawn with debutant Palestine, 2011 rival Jordan and former champion Iraq. With experiences, Japan was not hard to dominate the group stage. Japan defeated Palestine 4–0, Iraq 1–0 and Jordan 2–0 to win the group with full nine points and no goal conceded. This led to popular belief that Japan would have won the tournament again. However, the quarter-final encounter over the UAE was a shocking humiliation, when they just earned a 1–1 draw to the Gulf side after 120 minutes before losing 4–5 on the penalty shootout. The UAE would go on to win bronze medal in the tournament. It was Japan's worst finish ever since 1996.

Knockout stage
Quarter-finals

2019 AFC Asian Cup

Japan made their ninth appearance in the Asian Cup after they were drawn with Uzbekistan, Oman and Turkmenistan. As usual, Japan was regarded as one of the favourite teams to win the tournament.

Knockout stage
Round of 16

Quarter-finals

Semi-finals

Final

References

 
Countries at the AFC Asian Cup